Apeba is a genus of longhorn beetles of the subfamily Lamiinae, containing the following species:

 Apeba antiqua (Waterhouse, 1880)
 Apeba barauna Martins & Galileo, 1991
 Apeba isabellina (Bates, 1885)
 Apeba togata (Klug, 1825)

References

Hemilophini